Amin al-Hafez may refer to:

 Amin al-Hafez (Lebanon) (1926–2009), former Prime Minister of Lebanon 
 Amin al-Hafiz (1921–2009), Syrian politician, military officer and member of the Ba'th Party